The Srijane Viaduct, also known as Radovići Viaduct, is located between the Bisko and Blato na Cetini interchanges of the A1 motorway in Croatia. At this location the motorway route follows a horizontal curve of  radius. The viaduct comprises 13 spans.

The viaduct was completed in 2007, and it represents the most significant structure on Dugopolje–Šestanovac section of the A1 motorway.

Traffic volume
Traffic is regularly counted and reported by Hrvatske autoceste, operator of the viaduct and the A1 motorway where the structure is located, and published by Hrvatske ceste. Substantial variations between annual (AADT) and summer (ASDT) traffic volumes are attributed to the fact that the bridge carries substantial tourist traffic to the Adriatic resorts. The traffic count is performed using analysis of motorway toll ticket sales.

See also
List of bridges by length

References

Plate girder bridges
Bridges completed in 2007
Toll bridges in Croatia
Viaducts in Croatia
Buildings and structures in Split-Dalmatia County
Transport in Split-Dalmatia County